The Peterloo Memorial is a memorial in Manchester, England, commemorating the Peterloo Massacre. Designs for the memorial by the artist Jeremy Deller were unveiled in November 2018. It is sited close to the site of the massacre and was unveiled on 14 August 2019. The lack of disabled access to the monument has been criticised.

The Peterloo Memorial Campaign Group had been lobbying for a fitting memorial to The Peterloo Massacre for over ten years.

References

External links
 

2019 establishments in England
Monuments and memorials in Manchester
Peterloo massacre